Zinaīda Liepiņa (13 August 1907 – 15 March 2000) was a Latvian sprinter. She competed in the women's 100 metres at the 1928 Summer Olympics. She was the first woman to represent Latvia at the Olympics.

References

External links
 

1907 births
2000 deaths
Athletes (track and field) at the 1928 Summer Olympics
Latvian female sprinters
Olympic athletes of Latvia
Athletes from Riga
Olympic female sprinters